Harrowbarrow is a village in the parish of Calstock in east Cornwall, England.

All Saints, Harrowbarrow
In 1870 a parishioner presented the Rector with a piece of land, near the Prince of Wales Mine, and the church was designed by Mr J Piers St Aubyn and was built as a school and a mission chapel for £700. The church seats up to eighty worshippers.

References

External links
 

Villages in Cornwall